Astrud is a Spanish pop-rock group from the city of Barcelona which formed in the second half of the 1990s. Composed of Manolo Martínez and Genís Segarra (also in electronic band Hidrogenesse), they have met with a degree of critical and commercial success within the Spanish indie music scene. In 2006 they released a collection of rarities and B-sides called Algo cambió (Something Changed), which includes a Spanish-language cover version of the Pulp song of the same name.

Discography

Albums 
Mi Fracaso Personal 1999
 "Esto Debería Acabarse Aquí" – 3:52
 "Miedo A La Muerte Estilo Imperio" – 3:42
 "Es Increíble" – 3:48
 "Tres Años Harto" – 3:59
 "Vamos Al Amor" – 2:36
 "No Estaría Mal No Tener Que Saber Qué Es Lo Que Va A Pasar" – 2:42
 "La Nostalgia Es Un Arma" – 3:46
 "Bailando" – 2:35
 "Mi Fracaso Personal" – 2:21
 "El Amor Era Ésto" – 3:42
 "Atención" – 3:15
 "Cambio De Idea" – 3:37

Gran fuerza 2001
Performance 2004
Algo cambió (Sinammon Records, 2006)
Tú no existes' 2007

CD Singles 
Esto debería acabarse aquí 1999
Mentalismo 2001
La boda 2002
Mírame a los ojos 2002

EPs 
Superman 1998
Cambio de idea 2000
Todo nos parece una mierda 2004

Other 
Un mystique determinado 2004

References

External links 
 Astrud's official website (in Spanish)

Spanish indie rock groups